Jessica R. Lundy (born March 20, 1966) is an American actress best known for her television roles, especially as Joel Fleishman's fiancée/ex-fiancée Elaine Shulman on the series Northern Exposure.

Early life and education
Lundy was born in San Diego, California, the daughter of Jean (née McDonald) and Joel Lundy, a surgical oncologist. She grew up in Avon, Connecticut.  Lundy has a younger sister, Judy.

Lundy attended the Circle in the Square Theatre School.  She graduated with a Bachelor of Arts in 1987 at the Tisch School of the Arts of New York University, where she majored in drama and performing arts.  Lundy moved to Los Angeles in 1990.

Career
Lundy made her film debut with Bright Lights, Big City (1988).  That same year, she appeared in Caddyshack II (1988).  Lundy also appeared opposite John Larroquette in the 1990 film Madhouse.

Lundy auditioned for the role of Elaine Benes on Seinfeld. 

From 1990 to 1991, Lundy appeared opposite Edward Woodward in the short-lived series Over My Dead Body.

Lundy has also performed in theater.  In 1994, Lundy portrayed Rita Altabel in an Off-Broadway production of Uncommon Women and Others.

From 1995 to 1996, Lundy played the titular role of Gloria in the short-lived sitcom Hope and Gloria.

In 1996, she appeared opposite Tom Arnold in The Stupids.

From 2015 to 2019 Lundy portrayed Inspector Amanda Wainwright in the CBS educational series The Inspectors.

In 2016, she won a Daytime Emmy Award for Outstanding Performer in Children's Programming for her performance on The Inspectors.

Filmography

References

External links

1966 births
20th-century American actresses
21st-century American actresses
Actresses from San Diego
American film actresses
American television actresses
Circle in the Square Theatre School alumni
Daytime Emmy Award winners
Living people
People from Avon, Connecticut